Margit Nünke (15 November 1930, in Stettin – 10 January 2015, in Munich) was a German beauty pageant winner, model and actress.

Life

Nünke became Miss Germany on 11 June 1955 after previously being Miss North Rhine-Westphalia. In 1956, she won the election for Miss Europe 1956. When Miss Universe contest in 1955 in Long Beach, California, they reached the final and 4th place.

She appeared from 1957 to 1965 in nine feature films and two television movies, and from 1984 to 1985 in the TV series A class apart with.  Margit Nünke was the female lead in several films and was a partner of Peter Alexander, Gerhard Riedmann, and Toni Sailer, among others. As a singer, she recorded several singles, including a duet with Peter Garden.

Later years
Nünke lived in Munich with her husband of more than 40 years, actor Peter Garden. Garden died on 7 January 2015; Margit Nünke died three days later.

Selected filmography
 Engaged to Death (1957)
 Arena of Fear (1959)
 Twelve Girls and One Man (1959)
 Guitars Sound Softly Through the Night (1960)

External links
 
 British Film Institute profile 
 Listing showing Nünke's Miss Universe competition

References

1930 births
2015 deaths
German beauty pageant winners
German film actresses
German television actresses
Miss Universe 1955 contestants